This is a list of the judgments given by the Supreme Court of the United Kingdom in the year 2014. They are ordered by neutral citation.

In 2014 Lord Neuberger was the President of the Supreme Court, Lady Hale was the Deputy President.

The table lists judgments made by the court and the opinions of the judges in each case. Judges are treated as having concurred in another's judgment when they either formally attach themselves to the judgment of another or speak only to acknowledge their concurrence with one or more judges. Any judgment which reaches a conclusion that differs from the majority on one or more major points of the appeal has been treated as dissent.

All dates are for 2014 unless expressly stated otherwise.

Table key

2014 judgments

Notes

External links
 Supreme Court decided cases, 2014

Supreme Court of the United Kingdom cases
Judgments of the Supreme Court of the United Kingdom
Supreme Court of the United Kingdom
United Kingdom law-related lists